Richard Arthur Sohl (May 26, 1953June 3, 1990) was an American pianist, songwriter and arranger, best known for his work with the Patti Smith Group. He also played with Iggy Pop, Nina Hagen and Elliott Murphy. He died on June 3, 1990, of a heart attack while on vacation in Cherry Grove, New York.

Sohl was nicknamed DNV by Lenny Kaye, who thought that he resembled Tadzio, the beautiful Polish boy from Luchino Visconti's Death in Venice, played by Björn Andresen. DNV is an abbreviation of the movie title.

References

External links 
 
 

American rock pianists
American male pianists
American rock songwriters
American LGBT musicians
Patti Smith Group members
1953 births
1990 deaths
Musicians from New York City
Place of death missing
20th-century American pianists
20th-century American composers
20th-century American male musicians